Sesleria heufleriana is a species of perennial grass in the family Poaceae, native to central, southeastern, and eastern Europe and the Caucasus. Culms are erect, ranging from 30–70 cm long;  leaf-blades are conduplicate or convolute, and 20–35 cm long by 2–3 mm wide.

References 

 GrassBase entry
 GBIF entry

heufleriana